Art is a popular form of expression within the Asian American community and can be seen as a way for the community to push against tradition. Common forms of art are painting or photography and the first known record or Asian American art was in 1854, in the form of a photography studio by Ka Chau entitled "Daguerrean Establishment". Performance art became a popular form of expression by the 1960s, allowing artists like Linda Nishio to focus on issues of representation and self-image. Music is also used as a form of expression within the Asian American community.

Popular Asian American artists include Mary Tape, Tishio Aoki, Ching Ho Cheng, and Sessue Hayakawa.

Performance art 
Performance art is an art form that expands on the natural form of stage performance or Theater. It gives the performers/artists to explore elements that are only glanced at. Martha Graham is one of the most regularly mentioned when it comes to Performance Art in a more abstract manner. Asian American Artists like Winston Tong also went into this medium, except with an avant- gaerde approach. In the 21st Century, the realm has expanded in boundaries and responses from them the viewers/audience. University of Illinois at Chicago art student was arrested during his street performance because his outfit brought cioun to the viewers, assuming he was one of the killer clowns roaming in 2016.

Organizations and places supporting Asian American art 

Asian American Arts Alliance
Asian American Arts Centre
Chinese American Museum 
Chinese American Museum of Chicago
CAAM ( Center for Asian American Media )
FilAm ARTS 
Kearny Streets Workshops 
Museum of Chinese in America 
Tuesday Night Project 
Vietnamese American Arts & Letters Association
Visual Communication
 Wing Luke Museum of The Asian Pacific American Experience 
Asian American Arts Foundation
Grantmakers in the Arts
Pearl River Mart

See also 
 Asian Americans in arts and entertainment
 Smithsonian American Art Museum

References

Performance art